Double monocular O (uppercase: ,) is one of the exotic glyph variants of the Cyrillic letter O. This glyph variant can be found in certain manuscripts in the plural or dual forms of the word eye, for example  "[two] eyes". They were incorporated into Unicode as characters U+A66C and U+A66D in Unicode version 5.1 (2008).

See also
Ꙩ: Monocular O
Ꙫ: Binocular O
ꙮ: Multiocular O
Ꚙ: Double O

References

Eyes in culture
Grammatical number